Ancistroteuthis lichtensteinii, also known as the angel clubhook squid or simply angel squid, is a species of squid in the family Onychoteuthidae and the sole member of the genus Ancistroteuthis. It grows to a mantle length of 30 cm. It lives in the western Mediterranean Sea, subtropical and tropical eastern Atlantic Ocean and western north Atlantic Ocean. Its diet include mesopelagic fish and pelagic crustaceans. It is sometimes taken as bycatch by commercial fisheries, but is not a targeted species.

References

Further reading
Naef, A. 1921–23. Cephalopoda. Fauna und Flora des Golfes von Neapel. Monograph, no. 35. [English translation: A. Mercado 1972. Israel Program for Scientific Translations Ltd., Jerusalem, Israel. 863pp., IPST Cat. No. 5110/1,2.]
Pfeffer, G. 1912. Die Cephalopoden der Plankton-Expedition. Zugleich eine Monographische Übersicht der Oegopsiden Cephalopoden. Ergebniss der Plankton- Expedition der Humboldt-Stiftung 2:1-815.

External links

Tree of Life web project: Ancistroteuthis lichtensteinii
Ancistroteuthis lichtensteinii: Description Continued

Squid

Cephalopod genera
Monotypic mollusc genera
Taxa named by John Edward Gray